Vedbæk Station is a railway station serving the suburb of Vedbæk on the coast of North Zealand, c. 20 km north of central Copenhagen, Denmark.

The station is located on the Coast Line between Helsingør and Copenhagen. The train services are currently operated by Danish State Railways (DSB) which runs a frequent regional rail service to Copenhagen Central Station.

History
The station opened in connection with the inauguration of the Coast Line on 2 August 1897. At the time of its opening in 1900, the Nærum Line reached all the way to Vedbæk Station but the stretch from Nærum to Vedbæk was closed in 1923 due to economic constraints.

The main station building on Vedbæk Stationsvej has now been closed and is rented out for private celebrations and other events.

Architecture
Like the other stations on the Coast Line, Vedbæk Station was designed by Heinrich Wenck in a National Romantic style.

Two former residences for personnel from 1908 with various outbuildings are listed. They are designed by Christian Brandstrup and Holger Rasmussen.

References

Coast Line (Denmark)
Listed railway stations in Denmark
Listed buildings and structures in Rudersdal Municipality
Heinrich Wenck buildings
Railway stations opened in 1897
National Romantic architecture in Denmark
Art Nouveau railway stations
Railway stations in Denmark opened in the 19th century